The men's K-4 1000 metres event was a fours kayaking event conducted as part of the Canoeing at the 1980 Summer Olympics program.

Medalists

Results

Heats
14 crews entered in two heats on July 31, but two teams withdrew. The top three finishers from each of the heats advanced directly to the finals while the remaining six teams were relegated to the semifinal.

Semifinal
The top three finishers in the semifinal (raced on August 2) advanced to the final.

Final
The final was held on August 2.

References
1980 Summer Olympics official report Volume 3. p. 189. 
Sports-reference.com 1980 K-4 1000 m results.

Men's K-4 1000
Men's events at the 1980 Summer Olympics